Princess Cyd is a 2017 drama film written and directed by Stephen Cone and starring Rebecca Spence, Jessie Pinnick, and Malic White.

Plot
Cyd Loughlin, a headstrong 16-year-old, is sent away from her home in Columbia, South Carolina to spend the summer in Chicago with her estranged aunt Miranda, a kindhearted author of religious fiction. Though things are awkward at first, the two gradually become more close. As the summer progresses, they get to know each other over various activities, including going out for meals, walks around the neighborhood, and sunbathing. Both women become more like the other, with Cyd becoming more cultured and Miranda more easygoing. Cyd’s mother (Miranda's sister) died when she was young, and the two discuss whether she is waiting for them in Heaven.

Cyd explores her sexuality, developing a romance with a local barista named Katie, as well as a neighborhood boy. Miranda and her colleague Anthony have romantic feelings for one another, but neither are willing to make the first move. Cyd privately suggests to both of them that they should ask the other one on a date.

One night, Miranda hosts a large gathering of friends and creatives, where Cyd makes a conscious choice to wear a tuxedo instead of something more feminine. After the party, Cyd unwittingly insults Miranda's lack of a sex life, which causes brief friction between the two. Miranda sternly but lovingly states that "It is not a handicap to have one thing, but not another," and that mutual respect is a key factor in any healthy relationship.

That same evening, Katie calls Cyd for help after nearly being sexually assaulted. Cyd and Miranda come to her rescue, and Katie comes to stay with them for the remainder of the summer. After a day at the beach, Cyd and Katie make love. Cyd shares that years ago, her older brother murdered their mother and then took his own life, and that living with her grief-stricken father has not been easy.

Cyd discovers that she was named after the lead character in one of Miranda's earliest books, Princess Cydney.

As the summer ends, Katie and Cyd promise to visit each other, and attend an event for Miranda’s new book. After one last block party, Cyd returns to Columbia. Some time later, Cyd receives a call from Miranda, and the two affirm their love for one another.

Cast
Jessie Pinnick as Cyd Loughlin, the teenaged protagonist who is in the process of discovering herself and the world around her. 
Rebecca Spence as Miranda Ruth, Cyd's estranged aunt and a famous author of both fiction and non-fiction.
Malic White as Katie Sauter, Cyd's nonbinary love interest who teaches Cyd about living in Chicago. 
James Vincent Meredith as Anthony James, Miranda's colleague/would-be love interest. 
Tyler Ross as Tab, Katie's brothers roommate who ends up assaulting Katie. 
Matthew Quattrocki as Ridley, a neighborhood boy who Cyd has a brief romantic connection with. 

Stephen Cone has a voice cameo as the 911 caller at the beginning of the film.

Production
Principal photography for Princess Cyd took place in Chicago from August 31 to September 25, 2016.  Cone had originally conceived the story as taking place in his childhood home of South Carolina, as with his 2011 breakout film The Wise Kids.  Cone later decided to shift the story to Chicago, however, recalling, "...I was walking down Sunnyside Avenue one day, towards my friend's house at Damen and Sunnyside, and I love the houses along the way there, and suddenly the story just kind of shifted in my head."  He added, "I thought, very easily one of these houses could be inhabited by a well-regarded Chicago author, and maybe this is a summer tale set in Chicago. So suddenly this female-led excursion into Chicago became a love letter to women, a love letter to Chicago, a love letter to queerness."

The character of Katie was written without any gender in mind; it wasn't decided until casting whether the character would be male, female, or non-binary. 

Special permission was granted from James Baldwin's estate to use writing excerpt's during the dinner party scene.

Release
Before going on to screen at the BFI London Film Festival and wider acclaim, the film had its world premiere at the Maryland Film Festival on May 4, 2017.  Its New York City premiere was held at the BAMcinemaFest on June 17, 2017.  The film was picked up by Wolfe Video in May 2017 for a theatrical and VOD release.

For a period in 2020, it was streaming on the Criterion Channel.

Reception 
Princess Cyd has received a positive response from film critics, appearing on Best of 2017 lists in Vanity Fair, Vox, Vulture, IndieWire and NPR, among others. On review aggregator website Rotten Tomatoes, the film holds an approval rating of 95%, based on 43 reviews, and an average rating of 7.80/10. The site's summary of critics' consensus reads: "Princess Cyd defies coming-of-age convention to offer a sweetly understated - yet deeply resonant - look at pivotal relationships". On Metacritic, the film has a weighted average score of 72 out of 100, based on 10 critics, indicating "generally favorable reviews".

Calum Marsh of The Village Voice compared the film favorably to Cone's previous work Henry Gamble's Birthday Party and called it "an endearing, full-hearted comedy of self-discovery and mentorship and love." However, another review in the same paper by April Wolfe, while approving of the film overall, said it portrayed characters as too unaffected by tragedy or traumatic events. The film was similarly praised by Jude Dry of IndieWire, who observed, "In his latest film, Princess Cyd, the Chicago-based writer-director renders his deeply human characters so precisely, it's as if they stepped right off the screen and into your living room. The two central women are equal parts charming, awkward, yearning and lost. In short, they're real. Their complexity is all the more impressive coming from a male filmmaker — Cone proves it's possible for men to write sexually liberated, empowered, autonomous women."

Conversely, Nick Schager of Variety called it a "precious, threadbare indie" and wrote, "Caring more about what its characters represent — and its empathetic representation of them — than about crafting a fully formed drama concerning flesh-and-blood people, Cone's film has little more than its heart in the right place."

References

External links

Films directed by Stephen Cone
2017 films
2017 independent films
2017 drama films
American drama films
American LGBT-related films
Films shot in Chicago
Juvenile sexuality in films
LGBT-related drama films
2017 LGBT-related films
Lesbian-related films
LGBT-related coming-of-age films
2010s English-language films
2010s American films